Kamalia is a city in Toba Tek Singh District, Punjab, Pakistan.

Kamalia may also refer to:

 Kamalia Tehsil, a tehsil in Toba Tek Singh District, Punjab, Pakistan
 Kamalia railway station, Kamalia, Toba Tek Singh District, Punjab, Pakistan
 Kamalia Kathi, a clan of the Kshatriya tribe, notably including chieftains in Gujarat, India